Palmares is a district of the Palmares canton, in the Alajuela province of Costa Rica.

Geography 
Palmares has an area of  km² and an elevation of  metres. It is in the Central Valley (Valle Central), 6 kilometers southeast of the city of San Ramón, 38 kilometers northwest of the provincial capital city of Alajuela, and 56 kilometers from the national capital city of San Jose.

Demographics 

For the 2011 census, Palmares had a population of  inhabitants.

Transportation

Road transportation 
The district is covered by the following road routes:
 National Route 135
 National Route 148

Culture

Fiestas de Palmares
During January the city hosts their 'Fiestas', a large fair organized by a local committee which have become along with Zapote in December, and Liberia in July, one of the largest fairs in the country. This fair lasts for two weeks, with two days of special note: the 'Tope' (a massive horseback riding parade through town) and the 'Carnaval' (carnival); it is  said that during these days you can find over 500,000 people in Palmares. It ranks 2nd in most beer consumed in a yearly festival (after Oktoberfest)

References 

Districts of Alajuela Province
Populated places in Alajuela Province